Arabian or Arabians may refer to:
 Politically, all citizens of the countries of the Arabian Peninsula, which includes Saudi Arabia, Kuwait, Bahrain, Qatar, United Arab Emirates, Yemen and Oman
  Linguistically, related to the Arabian Peninsula or, in a broader sense, to the Arabian Plate
 The Arabs

Other
 Armand Arabian (1934-2018), American judge
 Arabian (video game)
 Arabian Business magazine
 Arabian Coast
 Arabian Desert
 Arabian horse
 Arabian mythology
 Arabian Nights, or One Thousand and One Nights
 Arabian oryx
 Arabian Sea
 James McCaulley (tug), also known as Arabian, a commercial tug chartered by the Navy in service from November 1918 to January 1919

See also
Arab (disambiguation)
Arabia (disambiguation)